Songs from the Road is a live album by Canadian singer-songwriter Leonard Cohen. Released on September 14, 2010, it is his twentieth album.

Overview
Songs From the Road appeared roughly 18 months after releasing Live in London, which preserved Cohen's July 2008 performance at London's 02 Arena. This album features 12 performances from his 2008 and 2009 concert dates, and while this album isn't a collection of rarities, it does feature a number of lesser-known songs (such as "Heart with No Companion" and "That Don't Make It Junk") and variant versions of some of his more famous (Cohen juggles the order of the verses on "Suzanne" and adds a new verse to "Bird on a Wire"). The selections were culled from a wide variety of locations, including Tel Aviv, Scotland, Finland, and Cohen's native Canada.

Reception
Songs from the Road elicited mixed reactions from critics. In his review for AllMusic, Mark Deming writes: "While Live in London was a richly satisfying souvenir of Cohen's inspired comeback shows, Songs from the Road is less impressive in its more modest scale and less cohesive atmosphere.  But the album still demonstrates that Cohen is a compelling and absorbing performer who brings his soul into every verse he sings, and his band is nothing less that [sic] superb …"

Robert Christgau, who considered Live in London "pretty close" to a career testament, called Songs from the Road "prunelike" and wrote that on the release "many titles are a touch less than prime", but he later noted that, like the other releases from the last stretch of Cohen's career, it was produced "without slackening his lifelong perfectionism".

Track listing

Musicians
 Leonard Cohen – lead vocal, guitar and keyboard
 Bob Metzger – lead guitar, pedal steel guitar and background vocal
 Javier Mas – 12-string guitar, bandurria, laud, archilaud 
 Roscoe Beck – musical director, electric bass guitar, stand-up bass and background vocal
 Dino Soldo – keyboard, wind instruments, harmonica and background vocal
 Neil Larsen – keyboards
 Rafael Bernardo Gayol – drums and percussion
 Sharon Robinson – background vocal
 The Webb Sisters:
 Charley Webb – background vocal and guitar
 Hattie Webb – background vocal and harp

Charts

Album

Video

Certifications

References

Leonard Cohen live albums
2010 live albums
Columbia Records live albums